The Gisborne railway station in Gisborne, New Zealand was the main railway station in Gisborne; and the northern terminus of the Palmerston North–Gisborne Line from 1942 when the line was opened, until 2012 when the line was mothballed beyond Napier. The line has been restored to Wairoa but remains mothballed to Gisborne. The station was closed to passengers from August 2002, although it had not been served by regular passenger trains since 1988 when services from Wellington, the unnamed successor to the Endeavour, were truncated at Napier.

The building has a Category II listing with the New Zealand Historic Places Trust.

The station was opened in 1902 as the main terminus of the line north to Ormond and Kaitaratahi, which later became the Moutohora Branch. The section from Gisborne to Ormond opened on 26 June 1902 and to Kaitaratahi in November that same year.

From 1915 to 1931 the Ngatapa Branch left the Moutohora Branch near Makaraka, but the Ngatapa Branch was closed when the coastal route to Wairoa and Palmerston North was adopted instead of the inland route via Ngatapa.

References 

Rail transport in the Gisborne District
Defunct railway stations in New Zealand
Buildings and structures in Gisborne, New Zealand
Heritage New Zealand Category 2 historic places in the Gisborne District
Railway stations opened in 1902
Railway stations closed in 2012
1900s architecture in New Zealand